OFM is a regional radio station based in Bloemfontein, South Africa.

It was originally a split of Radio Highveld, and began broadcasting under the name Radio Oranje (Radio Orange – after the Orange Free State, its home province) in 1986.

Footprint

OFM covers four provinces – the Free State, the North West province, Gauteng Gauteng  and the Northern Cape province. In 2005, it commenced broadcasts into the Vaal Triangle area. It broadcasts in English and Afrikaans, in an adult contemporary format. OFM runs a full news service, broadcasting up to 14 news bulletins daily. OFM is a commercial radio station licensed by ICASA. The head office is situated in Bloemfontein.

Ownership

It was privatised in 1996 after the South African Broadcasting Corporation decided to sell off its commercial regional stations. Current owners are African Media Entertainment (75%) and Kagiso Media (24.9%).

References

External links
South Africa's commercial radio stations

Adult contemporary radio stations
Radio stations established in 1986
Radio stations in Bloemfontein